Intravascular imaging is a catheter based system that allows physicians such as interventional cardiologists to acquire images of diseased vessels from inside the artery. Intravascular imaging provides detailed and accurate measurements of vessel lumen morphology, vessel size, extension of diseased artery segments, vessel size and plaque characteristics. Examples of intravascular imaging modalities are intravascular ultrasound (IVUS) and intracoronary optical coherence tomography (OCT or IVOCT).

See also
 Fractional flow reserve
 Intracoronary Optical Coherence Tomography
 intravascular ultrasound

References

Vascular procedures
Medical imaging